The Meadville Tribune is a seven-day morning daily newspaper published in Meadville, Pennsylvania, and covering Crawford County. It is owned by CNHI.

References

External links
 The Meadville Tribune Website
 CNHI Website

Daily newspapers published in Pennsylvania
Crawford County, Pennsylvania
Publications established in 1884